National Heroes Day is a holiday in the Philippines dedicated to Filipino heroes. It is a public holiday in the Philippines.

History 
The observance of National Heroes Day was already present during the American colonial period. Act No. 3827 by the Philippine Legislature enacted on October 28, 1931, designated every last Sunday of August as National Heroes Day. However, Bonifacio Day established by virtue of Act No. 2946 of 1921 was also dedicated to anonymous Filipino heroes. In practice, National Heroes Day celebrations were observed on the same day as Bonifacio Day. This continued during the Japanese occupation during World War II and some years after the United States granted the Philippines independence in 1946.

President Elpidio Quirino issued Administrative Order No. 190 in 1952 which reverted National Heroes Day back to the last Sunday of August. Administrative Code of 1987 of President Corazon Aquino designated the day as a regular holiday. The date of the holiday was revised again on July 24, 2007, via Republic Act No. 9492 which was signed into law by President Gloria Macapagal Arroyo.

Commemoration 
The law does not explicitly name any specific individual to be commemorated during National Heroes Day. Commemorations often include key figures in Philippine history who are regarded as national heroes though it could also include "lesser-known" and "ordinary" Filipinos. Examples include Overseas Filipino Workers and frontline workers during the COVID-19 pandemic.

References 

Public holidays in the Philippines
August observances
Heroes